Microvirgula is a Gram-negative bacteria genus from the family of Neisseriaceae. Up to now there is only one species of this genus known (Microvirgula aerodenitrificans).

References

Further reading 
 
 

Neisseriales
Monotypic bacteria genera
Bacteria genera